Hilary "Harry" Fisher Page (20 August 1904 – 24 June 1957) was an English toy maker and inventor of Self-Locking Building Bricks, the predecessor of Lego bricks. He founded the Kiddicraft toy company.

Early life 

Hilary "Harry" Fisher Page was born on 20 August 1904 in Sanderstead, England. He was the first child of Samuel Fisher and Lillian Maude Page. As a child he made his own wooden toys and invented games supported by his father who worked in the lumber trade.

Page was educated at Shrewsbury School from 1918 to 1923, where he began to display his entrepreneurial skills. Interested in photography, he set up a business developing photos for the other students. After his formal education he worked in the timber trade, like his father, for several years and in 1929 married Norah Harris, a long-time friend of the family. The couple's only  daughter was born in 1932. Together with his second wife Oreline he adopted twin girls in 1946.

Kiddicraft 

Page, along with several partners, decided to go into the toy business in 1932. The partners opened a small toy shop called Kiddicraft on Godstone Road in Purley, Surrey. Originally, Page imported wooden toys from Russia, but later began to introduce his own designs. Page had become increasingly unhappy using wood as a material for children's toys and was an early advocate of plastics as a safe and hygienic alternative. In 1936, he began manufacturing Kiddicraft ‘Sensible’ toys using new injection moulding technology and in 1937 these were sold under the Bri-Plax brand forming a new company, British Plastic Toys Ltd. Among them was an Interlocking Building Cube, for which he received a British patent in 1940.

The Self-Locking Building Brick 

Post WWII, Page designed and produced the Kiddicraft Self-Locking Building Bricks, that have been described as the "original LEGO". These were smaller, refined versions of the Interlocking Building Cube. Bricks could be stacked on each other and were held in place by studs on the top. The bricks also featured slits on their side that allowed panel-like doors, windows or cards to be inserted. He patented the basic design, a 2 × 4 studded brick, in 1947. This was later followed by patents for the side slits (1949) and the baseplate (1952), designs featured in exhibits at the Brighton Toy and Model Museum.

The Kiddicraft Self-Locking Building Brick sets were first marketed in 1947. As a promotion Page and his family built large display models for the 1947 Earl's Court Toy Fair. The Victoria and Albert Museum of Childhood in London lists the bricks among the "must-have toys" of the 1940s.

LEGO's copy 
Ole Kirk Christiansen and his son Godtfred became aware of the Kiddicraft brick after examining a sample, and possibly drawings, given to them by the British supplier of the first injection moulding machine they had purchased. Realising their potential, Ole modified the Kiddicraft brick and in 1949 marketed his own version, The Automatic Binding Brick, that became the Lego brick in 1953.

Page was reportedly never aware of this according to his family, and the company Lego Ole Christiansen founded expanded into Western Europe. British Lego Ltd. was set up in late 1959 and the first sets were sold the following year. Lego eventually acquired the residual rights to the Kiddicraft brick designs in 1981. In an out-of-court settlement, Lego paid UK £45,000 to the new owners of Page's company Hestair-Kiddicraft.

LEGO acknowledges Kiddicraft as the origin of their bricks on their history website, and tells a different version of how things happened. They say that they contacted Kiddicraft in the late 1950s to ask them if they would object to the LEGO brick, and that Kiddicraft did not.

Publications 
After founding Kiddicraft, Page spent several years studying early childhood play. He conducted research by spending time playing with children in various nursery schools to find out their interests. This research culminated in 1938 in the publication of his book titled Playtime in the First Five Years.

Death 

Troubled by pressures on the business and fearing a collapse of his company, Page died by suicide on 24 June 1957. In 1987, his widow stated, "He died before Lego brought out the product in Britain. He didn't know about it."

Posthumous recognition 

Page was recognised as an innovator in child education and toy design in 2007 with a Lifetime Achievement Award from the British Toy and Hobby Association.

References

External links

 Hilary Page Toys

1904 births
1957 deaths
Toy inventors
People from Sanderstead
1957 suicides
Suicides in the United Kingdom